Camphora may refer to:

 Camphora, a synonym for the chemical compound camphor
 Camphora, California, an unincorporated community in Monterey County
 Camphora (plant), genus of evergreen trees
Particularly Camphora officinarum

See also
 Camphor (disambiguation)